Welte may refer to:

People
Benedict Welte, a German Catholic exegete
Gottlieb Welté, an etcher and landscape painter from Mainz, Germany
Harald Welte, a programmer resident in Berlin, Germany

Other uses
Welte-Mignon, a manufacturer of orchestrions, organs and reproducing pianos
Wetzer-Welte Kirchenlexikon, an encyclopedic work of Catholic biography, history, and theology